Urszula Niebrzydowska (born 21 October 1961) is a Polish rower. She competed in the women's eight event at the 1980 Summer Olympics.

References

1961 births
Living people
Polish female rowers
Olympic rowers of Poland
Rowers at the 1980 Summer Olympics
Sportspeople from Gdańsk